Benjamin Philip Finegold (born September 6, 1969) is an American chess grandmaster and YouTuber/Twitch streamer. He had previously been nicknamed the "strongest International Master in the United States" until receiving his Grandmaster (GM) title in 2009.

Finegold became a USCF Master at the age of 14, Life Master (USCF) at 15, Senior Master (USCF) at 16, International Master (FIDE) at 20, and Grandmaster (FIDE) at 40.

Finegold was recipient of the U.S. Chess Trust's Samford fellowship. In addition to filming and streaming chess topics on social media sites, he has been active in giving live tournament commentary, lectures, and writing. He was the grandmaster-in-residence of the Saint Louis Chess Club, and co-founded the Chess Club and Scholastic Center of Atlanta.

Early life 
Finegold was born in Detroit, Michigan, into a chess family, the son of chess master Ron Finegold and his wife Rita. He learned the rules of chess at age 5 and received his first USCF rating at age 6.

Stuart Rachels says when he was twelve he saw Ben Finegold and his father Ron hustling in a chess club at Manhattan, offering 8:1 money bets on one-minute-per-player bullet games.

Finegold graduated high school in June 1986 at the age of 16. Afterward, he moved to Columbus, Ohio, to pursue chess.

Career 
Finegold said he had played in hundreds of tournament games a year when he was young: "I loved chess and if I lost it did not matter to me. That's the main thing you have to do to get better at chess – if you lose hundreds of games in a row, that's OK."

Finegold received the U.S. Chess Trust's  Samford fellowship in 1993.

Finegold tied for first place in the 1994 (Chicago, Illinois) and 2007 (Cherry Hill, New Jersey) U.S. Open Chess Championships. He tied for first (and achieved a grandmaster norm) in the 2002 World Open (Philadelphia, Pennsylvania), and also tied for first in the 2005 and 2008 National Open Chess Championships (Las Vegas, Nevada). He was ranked as one of the top 40 players in the United States on the August 2013 USCF rating list. Finegold has played in nine U.S. Chess Championships: 1994 (Key West, Florida), 1999 (Salt Lake City, Utah), 2002 (Seattle, Washington), 2005 (La Jolla, California), 2006 (San Diego, California), 2008 (Tulsa, Oklahoma), 2010 (Saint Louis, Missouri), 2011 (Saint Louis, Missouri), and 2013 (Saint Louis, Missouri).

In September 2009, he earned his third and final grandmaster norm at the SPICE Cup in Lubbock, Texas. Finegold's USCF rating has been "as high as 2662, at which point he was neck and neck with GM Larry Christiansen for the distinction of being the highest rated American born chess player in the country."

Finegold has been a live commentator at the U.S. Chess Championship, U.S. Junior Chess Championship, Sinquefield Cup, and Chess World Cup. He also frequently gave lively and often humorous instructional lectures at the Saint Louis Chess Club (formerly the Chess Club and Scholastic Center of Saint Louis). He was the grandmaster-in-residence of the Saint Louis Chess Club until August 14, 2012, where he filmed a number of chess YouTube videos. In 2017, Finegold and his wife Karen co-founded the Chess Club and Scholastic Center of Atlanta. Finegold's lectures are available on the YouTube channels of the Saint Louis Chess Club as well as the channel of the Chess Club and Scholastic Center of Atlanta and on Twitch.

As of 2021, Finegold streams chess five to six times a week, particularly on Twitch under the handle "GMBenjaminFinegold"; his account currently has over 121,000 followers. Highlights and clips from his Twitch streams are regularly uploaded to his Youtube channel with the same name. As of October 2022, his Youtube channel has over 110,000 subscribers. He also has a Twitter account, with more than 21,900 followers as of March 2023.

Finegold has appeared three times as a guest on the Perpetual Chess Podcast hosted by National Master Ben Johnson.

In 2000, Finegold co-authored a chess book with chess master Bob Ciaffone, titled Smith–Morra Gambit Finegold Defense.

Personal life 
Finegold was a student at Wayne State University.

In July 1988, Finegold moved to Brussels, Belgium, with Gina Lynne LoSasso, one of the top female players in the U.S. Finegold and Gina were married in January 1989 in Hastings, England. They have a son, Spencer Finegold, who is a chess National Master. He met his second wife, Kelly, on the Internet Chess Club. They married in March 2001 and have a daughter, Erum. He is currently living with his third wife Karen Boyd, a chess player with a background in programming.

Finegold has been a vegetarian since 1986. He became a vegan as a New Year's resolution in 2018.

References

Further reading
 "The 40-Year-Old GM", by Ben Finegold, Chess Life, February 2010, pp. 18–25.
 Smith–Morra Gambit Finegold Defense by Ben Finegold and Bob Ciaffone, Amazon, March 2000

External links
 
 
 
 
 Lectures with GM Ben Finegold at the Chess Club and Scholastic Center of Atlanta YouTube channel
 Lectures with GM Ben Finegold at the Saint Louis Chess Club YouTube channel
 
 
 

1969 births
Living people
American chess players
American chess writers
Chess grandmasters
Sportspeople from Detroit
Gaming YouTubers
Twitch (service) streamers